Yevgeniya Nikolayevna Sinskaya (1889-1965) was a Russian botanist noted for her research in plant taxonomy, phytogeography, species formation, and genetics.  She was head of the Taxonomy, Ecology and Geography Division at the Institute of Plant Industry.

References 

1889 births
1965 deaths
Soviet botanists
Russian women botanists